Lake Sartlan is an endorheic hyposaline lake in the Baraba steppe of Novosibirsk Oblast, Russia. Sartlan has a surface area of 238 km2 (92 sq mi). It is the third largest lake in Novosibirsk Oblast after Lake Chany and Lake Ubinskoye. It has an average depth of about 3 m and a maximum depth of 6 m.

In 1948 and 1984, cases of Haff disease were recorded near the lake. It is also known as Sartlan disease.

Gallery

References

Sartlan
Sartlan
Sartlan